La Puisaye is a commune in the Eure-et-Loir department in northern France.

Population

History
The Romans gave to the land of the Puisaye Podiacia name, due to unevenness of the surface that word (says the Encyclopedia) meaning a mountainous country It was covered with thick forests, and believed to have been the center "of Gaul, where the Druids held their meetings of annuals. ' Francais It is believed that the name Puisaye or Puisaye from the lords whom he fell in sharing during the conquest of Gaul and the establishment of the monarchy. Although the conduct and the end of this major war against the king, were also glorious to Louis le Gros, the results were advantageous to him - himself and his descendants, it seems the false policy which brought modern historians to distort even the names of the leaders of the Confederacy.

See also
Communes of the Eure-et-Loir department

References

Communes of Eure-et-Loir